The Ministry of Education, Employment and Gender Affairs is a ministry of the Cayman Islands. It is headquartered on the fifth floor of the Government Administration Building in George Town, Grand Cayman, Cayman Islands.

The Cayman Islands Department of Education Services (DES) operates public schools on the island. It is headquartered in a separate building in George Town.

References

External links
 Ministry of Education, Employment and Gender Affairs 
 Cayman Islands Department of Education Services
 DES school list

Education ministries
Government of the Cayman Islands